Sutee Suksomkit (born June 5, 1978) is a Thai professional football manager and former player who is the head coach of Thai League 3 club Bankhai United.

He is known for his skillful style of play, Sutee, nicknamed "Bird". He spent 8 years between 2001 and 2009 playing abroad for several clubs in Singapore and Australia. He also played for Thailand at international level from 2000 to 2012, earning 64 caps.

Club career

Sutee spent his youth career during 1995-1996 with an Asian powerhouse, Thai Farmers Bank F.C. The club was recently emerged champions of AFC Champions League (Asian Club Championship) twice consecutively between 1993 and 1995. The young striker made his first senior appearance with the club in 1996 and continued playing for the club totally 5 years until 2001.

The pacey forward scored 39 goals from 78 appearances for Thai Farmers Bank F.C.

In 2001, the promising forward joined a Singapore S-League club, Tanjong Pagar. He later adapted to play in various attacking positions including left winger, second striker and attacking midfielder. Sutee spent 2 seasons with the Singaporean side before moving to another S-League club, Home United, in 2003.

Sutee scored 30 goals from 56 appearances for Tanjong Pagar.

In 2004, a K-League side Busan I'Park expressed their interest in signing Sutee but eventually stepped off. However, regardless of his missing opportunity to join the Korean side, he was given an opportunity to take on a trial with an English Premier League club, Everton, as a part of a sponsorship deal between the Merseyside club and a Thai beer maker, Chang. The English club did not sign him afterward.

Between 2004 and 2005, an English Premier League club, Chelsea, had expressed their interest in signing the Thai forward. Chelsea eventually captured Sutee on a loan deal and sent him out to Brentford. However, Chelsea failed to apply a work permit for Sutee, caused him to return to Singapore.

With Home United, the Thai attacker did not score as many as he previously did with his former clubs, as he was placed in either wider position or drop deeper position in many occasions. However, he remained a crucial part of the team and spent fully 3 seasons with the club until 2006, made 96 appearances with 16 goals.

The versatile attacker was on the move again in early 2007, he joined Singaporean Tampines Rovers. Sutee made personal highest appearance with the Rovers, 110 appearances from 3 seasons between 2007 and 2009 and scored 30 goals.

On September 25, 2009 the 31 years old forward agreed a 3-month loan deal with A-League champions Melbourne Victory which concluded at the end of his contract with Tempines Rovers. Sutee made 9 appearances with the A-League champions.

On December 28, 2009, after 8 years of spending his career abroad, Sutee joined a Thai Premier League club, Bangkok Glass. Following the expiration of his contract in Bangkok, Suksomkit sign with Suphanburi and then TTM Customs and Krabi. After he joined Krabi F.C. and played for a while, he decided to retired from professional footballer after the end of the season in 2015.

Honours

International
Thailand
ASEAN Football Championship
 Winners : 2000, 2002
 Runner-up : 2007, 2008

Thailand U23
Asian Games
Quarterfinals :  2006
Thailand U17
AFC U-17 Championship
 Runner-up :  1996

Club
Thai Farmers Bank F.C.
 Kor Royal Cup Winner (1) : 2000

Home United
 S.League Champions (1) : 2003
 Singapore Cup Winner (2) : 2003 2005

Bangkok Glass
 Singapore Cup Winner (1) : 2010

International career
In the 2004 AFC Asian Cup, Sutee scored a goal against Japan, which was the only goal Thailand scored in the entire tournament.

In the 2007 AFC Asian Cup, he scored for Thailand in the opening match against Iraq from the penalty spot.

International goals

 2 goals against Denmark in 2009 King's Cup. Non official FIFA match

References

External links
Melbourne Victory profile
Star Players at Thai National Team page

Goal against Vietnam in the 2008 AFF Suzuki Cup

1978 births
Living people
Sutee Suksomkit
Sutee Suksomkit
Association football forwards
Association football midfielders
Sutee Suksomkit
Tanjong Pagar United FC players
Home United FC players
Tampines Rovers FC players
Melbourne Victory FC players
Sutee Suksomkit
Sutee Suksomkit
Sutee Suksomkit
Sutee Suksomkit
Sutee Suksomkit
Sutee Suksomkit
Thai expatriate footballers
Singapore Premier League players
Thai expatriate sportspeople in Singapore
Expatriate footballers in Singapore
A-League Men players
Thai expatriate sportspeople in Australia
Expatriate soccer players in Australia
Sutee Suksomkit
2000 AFC Asian Cup players
2004 AFC Asian Cup players
2007 AFC Asian Cup players
Footballers at the 2006 Asian Games
Sutee Suksomkit